General Officer Commanding, Ceylon (also known as Commander of Troops or Officer Commanding His/Her Majesties Troops, Ceylon) was the designation of the General Officer appointed to command all British Army units stationed in the island of Ceylon during the British colonial administration of the island. The post was succeeded by the Commander of the Ceylon Army.

History
The post entitled the holder a seat in the Executive Council of Ceylon and the Legislative Council of Ceylon, advised the Governor of Ceylon on military matters.

Apart from British Army units that were deployed for garrison duty in the island, the officer held command over the Ceylon Defence Force if mobilized. However mobilization could be carried out only under orders from the Governor.

Following independence in 1948, the command was split. With the creation of the Ceylon Army, it head had was referred to as the Commander of the Ceylon Army and the British troops in Ceylon came under the command of the Commander, Ceylon Garrison and UK troops in Ceylon until the withdrawal of British troops from the island.

Official Residence
The GOC Ceylon was entitled to a Class A Quarters issued to government officers for the use of his official residence in Colombo and had the General's House, Nuwara Eliya as a country house.

List of General Officers Commanding, Ceylon

See also
Commander of the Ceylon Defence Force
Commander-in-Chief, Ceylon

References

External links
British Commanders

 
Military personnel of the British Empire
Senior appointments of the British Army
British military commanders in chief